Yeşilçay can refer to:

 Yeşilçay, Erzincan
 Nurgül Yeşilçay